The 1939 Clemson Tigers football team was an American football team that represented Clemson College in the Southern Conference during the 1939 college football season. In their ninth and final season under head coach Jess Neely, the Tigers compiled a 9–1 record, outscored opponents by a total of 165 to 40, and defeated Boston College in the 1940 Cotton Bowl Classic. The 1940 Cotton Bowl was Clemson's first bowl game.

Joe Payne was the team captain. The team's statistical leaders included tailback Banks McFadden with 581 passing yards, fullback Charlie Timmons with 556 rushing yards, and wingback Shad Bryant with 32 points scored (4 touchdowns, 8 extra points). McFadden remained with Clemson for more than 40 years as a coach and administrator and was inducted into the College Football Hall of Fame in 1959.

Five Clemson players were named to the All-Southern team: tailback Banks McFadden; wingback Shad Bryant; center Bob Sharpe; end Joe Blalock; and tackle George Fritts.

Schedule

References

Clemson
Clemson Tigers football seasons
Cotton Bowl Classic champion seasons
Clemson Tigers football